Defending champion Martina Navratilova defeated Chris Evert-Lloyd in a rematch of the previous year's final, 6–3, 7–5, 6–1 to win the singles tennis title at the 1984 Virginia Slims Championships. It was her fifth Tour Finals singles title.

This was the first edition of the tournament to feature a best-of-five-sets final.

Seeds

  Martina Navratilova (champion)
  Chris Evert-Lloyd (final)
  Pam Shriver (semifinals)
  Andrea Jaeger (first round)
  Jo Durie (first round)
  Hana Mandlíková (quarterfinals)
  Andrea Temesvári (first round)
  Zina Garrison (first round)

Draw

See also
WTA Tour Championships appearances

External links
 1984 Virginia Slims Championships Draw

WTA Tour Championships
1984 Virginia Slims World Championship Series